Totally Boyband is a television programme that aired in the United Kingdom on MTV. The programme debuted on 18 September 2006 and aired on Sunday nights at 21:30 (GMT). The premise centred on the former members of boy bands and pop music bands attempting to regain their former fame by regrouping into a new band called Upper Street. A single called "The One (That Got Away)" was released on 23 October 2006, but spent only one week at number 35 after entering the UK Singles Chart on 29 October.

The participants were:
 Dane Bowers of Another Level
 Jimmy Constable of 911
 Lee Latchford-Evans of Steps
 Bradley McIntosh of S Club 7
 Danny Wood of New Kids on the Block

The single was later recorded without the help of Latchford-Evans, who was sacked by the rest of the band before their debut release due to a disagreement. He described the band's manager in the program, Jonathan Shalit as "two-faced".

It was announced in October 2006, that US music network VH1 would be producing its own version of the show, titled Mission: Man Band with Bryan Abrams (Color Me Badd), Rich Cronin (LFO), Chris Kirkpatrick (*NSYNC) and Jeff Timmons (98 Degrees).

References 

2006 British television series debuts
2006 British television series endings
MTV original programming
British music television shows
English-language television shows